Gordon Lynn Strate (May 28, 1935 – September 5, 2012) was a Canadian professional ice hockey player who played 61 games in the National Hockey League for the Detroit Red Wings as a defenceman between 1957 and 1959. The rest of his career, which lasted from 1955 to 1962, was spent in the minor leagues. He holds the record as the player to have played the most NHL games without recording a point.

Post-playing career
After retiring from hockey, he owned a tire shop in Fort St. John, British Columbia. Gord and his wife eventually returned to Sherwood Park, Alberta, just outside his hometown, to retire. He was an active member of the Church of Jesus Christ of Latter-day Saints and died at the age of 77.

Career statistics

Regular season and playoffs

References

External links
 

1935 births
2012 deaths
Brandon Regals players
Canadian ice hockey defencemen
Canadian Latter Day Saints
Cleveland Barons (1937–1973) players
Detroit Red Wings players
Edmonton Flyers (WHL) players
Edmonton Oil Kings (WCHL) players
Hershey Bears players
Ice hockey people from Edmonton
Sudbury Wolves (EPHL) players